Bitterman Building, also known as The New Bitterman Building, is a historic commercial building located in downtown Evansville, Indiana. It was designed by the architecture firm Clifford Shopbell & Co. and built in 1923.  It is a three-story, rectangular brick building with limestone facing. It features Chicago school style openings.  The building adjoins the Old Bittermann Building.

It was added to the National Register of Historic Places in 1980.

References

Commercial buildings on the National Register of Historic Places in Indiana
Commercial buildings completed in 1923
Buildings and structures in Evansville, Indiana
National Register of Historic Places in Evansville, Indiana
Chicago school architecture in Indiana